Lindsay McQueen (Villajoyosa, Spain, 28 May 1979) is a hydroflight athlete. He has been involved with the company FlyBoard since it was invented by a French watercraft rider, Franky Zapata in spring 2011 and has actively taken part in the growth of FlyBoard.

He has taken part in all World Championships to date, Qatar (2012), Qatar (2013) and Dubai (2014). His best result was in 2012 when he came in 5th place, disqualified by a head-to-head battle in quarterfinals by Stephane Prayas from France, who went on to become the World Champion of that year.

He lives and trains on Ibiza where he is sponsored and is image for the Ushuaïa beach hotel, Maremoto Jets, SEA-DOO Watercraft, Alkkemist premium Gin and FlyBoard Spain.

Early life and education
At age 5 he started water-skiing at the Cable Ski Benidorm in his home town in Benidorm (Alicante) and at age 8 he started to compete for the Spanish water-ski team in the category of Slalom achieving various Spanish champion titles. At age 13 he moved to Nottingham, UK to study. After finishing his studies at Carlton le Willows school he moved back to Spain where at age 19 started water-skiing professionally again and working as an instructor at Cerro de Alarcón water-ski school in Madrid where amongst other personalities he gave lessons to the present king of Spain SM Felipe VI. He was also one of the first Wakeboarder's in Spain and was the winner of the first Spanish national Wakeboard Championship held at Casa de Campo, Madrid. At age 29 he moved to Ibiza, Spain where he continued with businesses related to water-sports and in beginning of 2012 when French watercraft rider Franky Zapata invented the FlyBoard he signed the exclusivity for Spain and has dedicated his life to this sport ever since.

FlyBoard shows

Thanks to his past experience in Water-skiing and Wakeboarding he quickly progressed and self-taught himself with the FlyBoard and is now a reference for the sport. After the first FlyBoard World cup held in Dubai, 2012 he became part of a select group of riders that made a series of FlyBoard shows around the world. 
At the training sessions for one of the shows at KaruJet in Guadeloupe, Caribbean, he was one of the 5 riders (Patrick Esnard, John Albinson, Emmanuel Jules, Stephane Prayas) that decided to experiment the use of the FlyBoard without the arm stabilizers that where originally invented by Franky Zapata, soon after this the decision was taken to use the FlyBoard without arm stabilizers. In September 2013 this group of riders was to hold a show in Azerbaijan for the Minister of Sports, on arrival and unexpectedly, early elections where announced and because of this the show was cancelled because it was not allowed to make shows in public areas. As a result, the team had the idea to make the show in a private place, in this case was the hotel swimming pool. This was one of the first FlyBoard Show's in a swimming pool. Lindsay McQueen performed what would be the first backflip with a FlyBoard in the world inside a swimming pool. At the hotel the team met professional Saxophonist Anastasia Zhukouskaya and had the idea for her to play the Saxophone on the FlyBoard as part of the show.

Flyboard shows are very popular in the most popular events, weddings, beach and night clubs around the world. Lindsay McQueen is one of the most experienced FlyBoard Showmen in the world and makes regular shows during the summer months at some of the best clubs and events in Ibiza.

McQueen has also appeared on various TV commercials and TV programs like Vodafone, Heineken, Hormiguero with Tom Cruise, Les Princes de l'Amour and more.

Some of McQueen's flyBoard shows
Heineken show
 Destino ibiza day FlyBoard Saxophone show with Anastasia McQueen
 Destino ibiza Night FlyBoard Saxophone Show with Anastasia McQueen
Tron show at Lio ibiza
 52 Series show ibiza with Anastasia McQueen
 Zensa Denia
 Ocean Club ibiza

Performances and media

Competitions
1988. Water-skiing Spanish national champion in the "Alevin category"
1989. Water-skiing Spanish national champion in the "Alevin category"
1990. Water-skiing Spanish national champion in the "Alevin category"
1991. Water-skiing Spanish national champion in the "Alevin category"
1998. First Wakeboard Spanish national champion at Casa de Campo, Madrid
2012. FlyBoard World Cup 5th place at Doha, Qatar
2013. FlyBoard World Cup disqualified in first round for "flipping" the Jet ski, new rule for that year.
2014. FlyBoard World Cup 10th place after first round at Dubai, UAE

Media
2012 Programa TV "El Hormiguero" – FlyBoard show con Tom Cruise
2012 Dia de las alas de Red Bull – Primer Show con FlyBoard en España
2012 Qatar news headlines
2012 Water-Jetpack.com 2012 World cup results
2012 Emol.com news article
2012 El Mundo interview
2012 GQ Magazine review
2012 Barcoibiza.com review
2012 Tyoobe.com Red Bull FlyBoard show
2012 Pinterest.com World cup mention
2012 El Hormiguero TV program with Tom Cruise
2013 Divinity.es news article
2013 Front cover of Hello magazine
2013 Proflyboard.com article
2013 Efetur.com news article
2013 Shjiponja.com Article on World Cup
2013 IB3 TV programme interview
2013 Private FlyBoard lessons with Leo Messi, Cesc Fabregas and Jose Manuel Pinto
2014 Laverdad.es article
2014 Ridersmatch.com World cup qualifying video
2014 Heineken Advertisement
2014 Official presentation HoverBoard España 
2014 Atractivas.es interview
2014 Jetski-valencia.com review
2014 Nauta360.com JetSki festival
2014 Destinosancarlos.com

References

External links
 
 vision of Franky Zapata and Lindsay McQueen

1979 births
People educated at Carlton le Willows Academy
Living people